The Cape Cod Central Railroad is a heritage railroad located on Cape Cod, Massachusetts.  It operates on a rail line known as the Cape Main Line which is owned by Massachusetts Department of Transportation.  The line was previously owned and operated by the Cape Cod Railroad, the Old Colony Railroad, and later the New Haven Railroad, each of which operated passenger trains on the line from 1854 to 1959.  Although it is the namesake of the Cape Cod Central Railroad (1861–68), the two companies are unrelated.

Services
Founded in 1999, it operates a variety of excursion trains from downtown Hyannis to the Cape Cod Canal during spring, summer, and fall. Recently, it has expanded service in a limited capacity to offer rides that travel the reverse of the normal route. It also offers special trains that travel to Wareham. Most of their trips are made during the Scallop Festival or during the summer when the Family Supper Train and Scenic Train depart together from Buzzards Bay. It offers daily sightseeing trains known as the Shoreline Excursion, a Family Supper train, Brunch and Lunch trains, and an Elegant Dinner train that was rated one of the top three in the nation by the Food Network. Past offerings have also included special Easter, Thanksgiving, and Christmas trains.

On November 21, 2009, the railroad ran dinner service on the Falmouth Line via North Falmouth.

This Railroad should not be confused with, although is affiliated with, the Massachusetts Coastal Railroad - the freight railroad that transports trash off of the Cape.  Since 2006, the Cape Cod Central Railroad has been a wholly owned subsidiary of Cape Rail Inc., which also owns and operates the Massachusetts Coastal Railroad. In October 2012, Chicago-based Iowa Pacific Holdings acquired control of Cape Rail Inc., and its subsidiaries, Massachusetts Coastal Railroad, LLC and Cape Cod Central Railroad.

Rolling stock
The Cape Cod Central Railroad has three locomotives, and generally uses two on each train in a pull-pull configuration due to a lack of convenient switching locations. ALCo RS3m #1201, nicknamed "Lulubell," was originally built in May 1951 for the New York Central Railroad as locomotive #8246. It has also served Penn Central, Amtrak, Connecticut Central Railroad, and Providence and Worcester Railroad. #1201 did not run during the 2011 season; since it was at the end of its useful life, it was scrapped on September 17, 2011.  EMD GP7 #1501, along with its sister engine #1502, was originally built in 1952 for the Atlanta and St. Andrews Bay Railway. The 1501 recently emerged in a new paint scheme identical to sister railroad Massachusetts Coastal's paint scheme. The engine is now in service on Cape Cod Central trains. Sister 1502 has not run in several years and a return to service is not likely in the foreseeable future. EMD E9 #2400 and its sister EMD E9 #2402 are former Susquehanna railroad units. 2402 is being used for parts to fix 2400.

The railroad has 8 cars in service, as well as a Budd RDC which is owned privately. The Barnstable (#101), Sandwich (#102), and Bourne (#103) cars are used for sightseeing tours, and are all former Long Island Rail Road 2700 series commuter cars. The kitchen/generator car (#250) is used on dining trains, as all meals served are prepared on board the train. The Cape Codder (#200) lounge car is a vintage piece of equipment originally from the Illinois Central Railroad. Much of the interior is original, including a number of pieces of plate glass. The Sandy Neck (#201), Great Island (#202), and Race Point (#203) dining cars were all built in the early 1940s and have since been completely restored.

Station list 

Despite the four stations above all being served by the Cape Cod Central Railroad, most trains do not visit or even pass by all four stations. Trains typically either depart from Buzzards Bay station and turn around upon reaching Cape Cod Bay (usually near either Sandwich or Barnstable), or depart from Hyannis, stop at West Barnstable (on Saturdays), and turn around upon reaching Sagamore. There are some exceptions, as some trains departing from Hyannis travel all the way to Buzzards Bay and sometimes all the way into Rochester, but these trains usually do not stop at any stations after departure.

Despite not having formal stations, select trains also stop at the Pairpoint Glass facility in Sagamore, and select dinner trains also depart from Falmouth.

See also
Cape Cod Railroad
List of heritage railroads in the United States
Cape Codder (train)

References

External links

Cape Cod Central Railroad. (YouTube), Great Scenic Railway Journeys

 
Heritage railroads in Massachusetts
Barnstable, Massachusetts
Bourne, Massachusetts
Sandwich, Massachusetts
Tourist attractions in Barnstable County, Massachusetts
1999 establishments in Massachusetts